Estádio Municipal Bento de Abreu Sampaio Vidal, usually known as Estádio Bento de Abreu or, sometimes by its nickname Abreuzão is a multi-use stadium in Marília, Brazil. It is currently used mostly for football matches. The stadium has a capacity of 19,800 people. It was inaugurated on April 4, 1967.

The stadium is owned by the Marília City Hall, and it is the home stadium of Marília Atlético Clube.

References

Guia 2006 Brasileirão - Placar magazine

External links
Templos do Futebol

Bento de Abreu
Marília
Sports venues in São Paulo (state)